The County of Northern Lights is a municipal district in northwest Alberta, Canada.  Located in Census Division 17, its municipal office is located in the Town of Manning.

The municipality recently changed its name from the Municipal District (M.D.) of Northern Lights No. 22 to the County of Northern Lights.  The Province of Alberta officially approved the name change on February 3, 2010.

On April 1, 1995, the M.D. of Northern Lights No. 22 was formed through the incorporation of the former Improvement District No. 22 as a municipal district.

Geography

Communities and localities 
 
The following urban municipalities are surrounded by the County of Northern Lights.
Cities
none
Towns
Manning
Villages
none
Summer villages
none

The following hamlets are located within the County of Northern Lights.
Hamlets
Deadwood
Dixonville
North Star
Notikewin
Métis settlements
Paddle Prairie Metis Settlement

The following localities are located within the County of Northern Lights.
Localities 
Chinook Valley
Clear Hills
Fairacres
Hawk Hills
Hotchkiss
Keg River
Kemp River
Leddy
Scully Creek
Smithmill
Sweet Water
Warrensville
Warrensville Centre
Weberville
Other places
Carcajou
Twin Lakes

Demographics 

As a census subdivision in the 2016 Census of Population conducted by Statistics Canada, Northern Lights had a population of 4,200 living in 1,538 of its 1,846 total private dwellings, a  change from its 2011 population of 4,117. This includes the population of the Paddle Prairie Metis Settlement (544), located within the census subdivision that is a municipality independent of the County of Northern Lights.

Attractions 
Figure Eight Lake Provincial Recreation Area
Leddy Lake Provincial Recreation Area
Sulphur Lake Provincial Recreation Area
Notikewin Provincial Park

See also 
List of communities in Alberta
List of municipal districts in Alberta

References

External links 

 
Northern Lights